Deadman's Bay may refer to:

 Deadman's Bay, Newfoundland and Labrador, Canada, a community
 Deadman's Bay (Newfoundland and Labrador), Canada, a natural bay